Elyse Ribbons (October 27, 1980 - ) is an American entrepreneur, writer, businesswoman, and playwright who lives and works in Beijing.  Known in China by her Chinese name Liu Suying (柳素英) who spends time on both corporate work media work (via columns, a nationally syndicated radio show- China Radio International's Laowai Kandian, regular news media appearances and filming movies). She is currently the CEO and Founder of GeiLi Giving, winner of several awards in the startup and social entrepreneurial space. She has authored several articles for Forbes magazine on business, culture, and life in China.

Cheeky Monkey Theater'
She holds an MFA in Peking Opera. She created a theater company, Cheeky Monkey Theater in 2007, which is based in Beijing and produced original works 5 or 6 times a year. Performances include I Heart Beijing and Green Eyes on China. Ribbons also created and produced the annual Shifen (10-minute) Theater Festival in China's capital city, featuring productions lasting anywhere from 15 to 45 minutes long.

Ribbons has appeared in local magazines and newspapers and Chinese television programs. She can also be recognized from pictures depicting the 2008 Olympics hosted in Beijing. She previously worked for the US Embassy in China.

She has also starred as Helen Foster Snow in the television series based Red Star Over China which aired to millions of viewers on Hunan TV in 2016.

References

External links
 https://web.archive.org/web/20110718140458/http://bjtoday.ynet.com/article.jsp?oid=43387305
 https://web.archive.org/web/20090119155329/http://bjtoday.ynet.com/article.jsp?oid=46279309
 https://www.wsj.com/articles/SB121856322566933893
 http://www.cityweekend.com.cn/beijing/articles/cw-magazine/day-life/playwright/
 http://www.china.org.cn/culture/2008-11/27/content_16837661.htm
 Article title
 http://gbtimes.com/life/journey-east-elyse-ribbons-decade-beijing
 http://www.sino-us.com/21/Elyse-Ribbons-China-is-my-home-too.html
 
 http://www.iheartbeijing.com/?override=1
 https://www.forbes.com/sites/elyseribbons/
 https://www.techinasia.com/chinaccelerator-7th-batch-startups
 http://www.npi.org.cn/category/aboutus/news/page/3
 http://www.bjreview.com/Special_Reports/2016/Celebrating_the_80th_Anniversary_of_the_Long_March/In_Depth/201610/t20161018_800069634.html
 http://blog.lareviewofbooks.org/chinablog/helen-foster-snow-qa-elyse-ribbons/

Living people
American businesspeople
Year of birth missing (living people)